The Alberta Poetry Yearbook was an annual publication of entries into a poetry contest administered by the Canadian Authors Association, Edmonton, Alberta branch. The chapbook was published from 1930 until 1990, and the final year of publication was followed by a collection of the best work published in the annual volumes.

Alberta Scouten, secretary of the Edmonton branch of the Canadian Authors Association for many years, started the Alberta Poetry Year Book in 1930. Lasting for 60 years, it served as an important poetry market. Scouten was evidently a writer's dream of an editor as she was reported to carry on an extensive and sympathetic correspondence with many of the contributors, winners and losers alike.

The Alberta Poetry Year Book was continued by June Fritch in 1952, who edited it for the next 27 years. Entry fees covered the cost of prizes, production and distribution and it made a small profit for the Branch. Cora Taylor served as editor from 1980–85, R. John Hayes from 1986–87 and Jane Livingston from 1988–89. In 1990, John W. Chalmers edited a collection of the best sixty years of the Alberta Poetry Yearbook, entitled Sixty Singing Years, with the editorial assistance of Cora Taylor and Elaine Moody.

See also
Canadian poetry

References

Canadian poetry
Culture of Alberta